The Northeast Community Health Centre (NECHC) is a community health centre located in Northeast-Edmonton. It provides medical services through Alberta Health Services, including a 24/7 emergency department.

Services and Programs
The main services and programs the community health centre provides are.
Audiology Services
Child and Adolescent Health
Child Health Clinics Community
Child Safety Seat Round-Up
Children's Asthma Clinic
Diabetic Nephropathy Prevention Clinics
Drop In for New Mothers/families and Infants
Early Childhood Oral Health Services
Emergency Departments
Family Health

References

Medical and health organizations based in Alberta
Hospitals established in 1999
1999 establishments in Alberta